The Marion and McPherson Railroad was a short-line railroad in central Kansas.

History
As early as 1875, city leaders of Marion held a meeting to consider a branch railroad from Florence to Marion.  In 1878, the Marion and McPherson Railway Company was chartered.

In 1879, a rail line was built from Florence to McPherson.  In 1880, it was extended to Lyons, in 1881 it was extended to Ellinwood.  In 1901, the line was leased and operated by the Atchison, Topeka and Santa Fe Railway, which used the name "Florence & Ellinwood Division" for it.

The line from Florence to Marion was abandoned in 1969. In 1992, the line from Marion to McPherson was sold to Central Kansas Railway. In 1993, after heavy flood damage, the line from Marion to McPherson was abandoned. In 2001, Kansas and Oklahoma Railroad (K&O) took over operations of Central Kansas Railway.

Currently, the remaining parts of the former Marion and McPherson Railroad that still exists is:
 Ellinwood to Lyons,

Stations
At a high-level, the railroad connected the primary cities of Ellinwood (west end), Lyons, McPherson, Marion, Florence (east end).

 Ellinwood (west end)

 Silica
 Chase
 Lyons
 Mitchell
 Little River

 Windom
 Conway
 McPerson
 Galva
 Canton

 Lehigh
 Hillsboro
 Canada
 Marion
 Oursler
 Florence (east end)

See also
 Florence, El Dorado, and Walnut Valley Railroad, a defunct railroad that started in Florence
 List of Kansas railroads

References

Further reading
 Stouffer's Railroad Map of Kansas; J.W. Stouffer; 1 page; 1915-1918.
 Standard Atlas of Marion County Kansas; Geo A. Ogle & Co; 99 pages; 1921.
 Standard Atlas of McPherson County, Kansas; Geo. A. Ogle & Co; 82 pages; 1921.
 Standard Atlas of Rice County, Kansas; Geo. A. Ogle & Co; 75 pages; 1919.
 Atlas and Plat Book of Barton County, Kansas; Kenyon Co; 55 pages; 1916.

External links
 Current Kansas Railroad Map

Defunct Kansas railroads